Choices is a 1986 American made-for-television drama film starring George C. Scott, Jacqueline Bisset and Melissa Gilbert, directed by David Lowell Rich. It was originally broadcast on ABC on February 17, 1986.

Plot
The film focuses on a 62-year-old judge who rethinks his opposition to abortion when he finds out both his 19-year-old daughter and 38-year-old wife are pregnant. When his daughter contemplates an abortion without informing her boyfriend, the judge immediately expresses his disapproval. He changes his mind when he finds out his wife is pregnant as well. The three are all forced to make important choices.

Cast
George C. Scott as Evan Granger
Jacqueline Bisset as Marisa Granger
Melissa Gilbert as Terry Granger
Laurie Kennedy as Ellen
Steven Flynn as Scott
Nancy Allison as Norma
Daliah Novak as Janet
Lorena Gale as Clinic Staffer

References

External links

1986 television films
1986 films
1986 drama films
ABC network original films
Films about abortion
Films directed by David Lowell Rich
American drama television films
1980s American films